Sardar Narinder Singh Kapoor (born 6 March 1944) is an Indian writer from Punjab. His writings are about social, cultural and psychological issues.  He lives in Patiala, Punjab.

Kapoor was born in the village of Adhi, in Rawalpindi District (formerly in India, now Pakistan.) His family settled in Patiala, after staying at a number of refugee camps after being misplaced in the division of Punjab.

He graduated with his M.A. in English from the Punjabi University at Patiala.

He was made Lecturer in English by Punjab Public Service Commission in 1966 and he worked at the Colleges in Nabha, Sangrur and Patiala.

His writings are influenced by his life's experiences, academically and personally. He has been awarded the Shiromani Sahitkaar award for his works.

Awards 
 Shiromani Sahitkaar Award by Language Department, Punjab.
 Gurbax Singh Preetlari Prize by Languages Department, Punjab for the book Ahmo Sahmane.

List of Works

Collections of essays

Vyakhya Vishleshan/Tarkved
Ahmo Sahmane
Ghaat Ghaat da Paani
Buhe Barian
Antar Jhaat
Sukhan Sunehe
Dhoongiaan Sikhraan
Tarakved
Raah -Raaste
Giyani Ditt Singh (Jeevan Te Rachna )
Dar-Darvaaje
SAccho-Sach (America Da SAfarnaama )()
Punjabi Kavita Vich RAshtri Ekta Di Bhavna
Punjabi Patrkari Da Ithaas

Anthologies

Mala Manke
Kaleyan Da Kaflaa
Khidkiyaan
Mala Manke 2

He has been awarded the Shiromani Sahitkaar Award and the Gurbax Singh Preetlari Prize for his book Ahmo Sahmane.

Other works 
 Kandaadhe Chhadh ke Vekhya Amreeka (Travelogue)
 Punjabi Pattarkaari da Vikaas (History of Punjabi Journalism)

Translations 
 Pio Puttar (ਪਿਓ ਪੁੱਤਰ, translation in Punjabi of Ivan Turgnev's Fathers and Sons)
 Bharat di khoj (ਭਾਰਤ ਦੀ ਖੋਜ, translation in Punjabi of Jawaharlal Nehru's The Discovery of India)

References

External links 
 Narinder Singh Kapoor

20th-century Indian translators
Punjabi people
Writers from Punjab, India
Sikh writers
20th-century Indian essayists
1944 births
Living people
People from Patiala